The 1993 Porsche Tennis Grand Prix was a women's tennis tournament played on indoor hard courts at the Filderstadt Tennis Centre in Filderstadt, Germany and was part of the Tier II of the 1993 WTA Tour. It was the 16th edition of the tournament and was held from 11 October to 17 October 1993. Third-seeded Mary Pierce won the singles title and earned $75,000 first-prize money as well as 300 ranking points.

Finals

Singles
 Mary Pierce defeated  Natasha Zvereva 6–3, 6–3
 It was Pierce's 1st singles title of the year and the 5th of her career.

Doubles
 Gigi Fernández /  Natasha Zvereva defeated  Patty Fendick /  Martina Navratilova 7–6(8–6), 6–4

Prize money and ranking points

References

External links
 Official website 
 ITF tournament edition details
 Tournament draws

Porsche Tennis Grand Prix
Porsche Tennis Grand Prix
1993 in German tennis
1990s in Baden-Württemberg
Porsch